Giulio Morina (1550 in Bologna – 1609 in Mirandola) was an Italian painter active between 1570 and 1609 in Italy.

He was a pupil of Nicola Sabbatini. His works are preserved in the churches of Bologna.

References
 Nicholas Terpstra, The art of executing well: rituals of execution in Renaissance Italy, Truman State Univ Press, 2008

16th-century Italian painters
Italian male painters
17th-century Italian painters
Painters from Bologna
1550 births
1609 deaths